Planica 1949 was an International ski jumping week with two competitions on a new K80 hill, held on 20 and 27 March 1949 in Planica, PR Slovenia, FPR Yugoslavia. Over 20,000 people were gathered.

Schedule

Competitions
On 19 March 1949, International Ski Jumping Week has officially started with premiere jumps on the new Srednja Bloudkova K80 normal hill. Janez Polda was the longest with 77 metres.

On 20 March 1949, Opening international competition was on schedule, first of two events this week. Evert Karlsson from Sweden won the premiere event with 74 and 75 metres. It was a tribute to all the victims of Slovenian Liberation front.

On 21 March 1949, first training was on schedule with 19 jumpers on start: 15 Yugoslavians, 3 Italians and 1 Finnish. The longest jump of the training was set by Aldo Trivella at 69 metres.

On 22 March 1949, second training was on schedule on two to four rounds with 22 jumpers on start: 13 Yugoslavians, 5 Swiss, 3 Italians and 1 Finnish. The longest jump of the training was set by Carlo De Lorenzi at 78 metres.

On 23 March 1949, third training was on schedule with 100 jumps in four rounds and 31 competitors on start: 15 Yugoslavians, 4 Swiss, 2 Swedish and 2 Finnish and 1 Austrian. The longest jump of the training was set by Janez Polda at 80.5 metres.

On 24 March 1949, fourth training was on schedule in three rounds and 24 competitors on start: 18 Yugoslavians, 6 Swiss, 3 Italians, 2 Austrians, 1 Swedish and 1 Finnish. The longest jump of the training was set by Janez Polda at 76 metres.

On 26 March 1949, fifth training was on schedule, but it was canceled without a single jump due to high temperatures and melting snow. Hill had to be prepared for the Sunday international event with snow plates from hill surroundings.

On 27 March 1949, second international competition in front of 15,000 people was on schedule, to close the Planica week events with 31 jumpers on start. Janez Polda won the event with 76.5 and 80 metres.

Hill test
19 March 1949 — One round — chronological not available

International competition 1
20 March 1949 — Two rounds — official results — chronological order incomplete

Training 3
23 March 1949 — Four rounds — best jump and average style

Training 4
24 March 1949 — Three rounds — best jump and average style

International competition 2
27 March 1949 — 10 AM — Two rounds — official results — chronological order incomplete

 Fall or touch!

Hill specifications
Top of the 11 metres of inrun was artificial, otherwise hill was completely natural. New K80 hill technical data:

108 metres — total height difference
46 metres — inrun height difference
101 metres — inrun length
2.8 metres — take-off table height
62 metres — outrun length
78 metres — critical point
84 metres — jury distance
4 metres — inrun width
6 metres — take-off table width
18 metres — landing zone width
25 metres — outrun width

References

1949 in Yugoslav sport
1949 in ski jumping
1949 in Slovenia
Ski jumping competitions in Yugoslavia
International sports competitions hosted by Yugoslavia
Ski jumping competitions in Slovenia
International sports competitions hosted by Slovenia